The Parra family is a Chilean family known for its many artists. Members of the Parra family are noted contributors to Chilean culture with almost every member being a distinguished national artist. The family is not related to the Parra brothers, members of the Chilean rock fusion group Los Jaivas.

Family members

First generation
 Nicanor Parra (1914-2018) - Physicist and self-styled "anti-poet"
 Hilda Parra (1914-1975) - Folklorist artist, toured with Violeta as "Las Hermanas Parra"
 Violeta Parra (1917-1967) - Folklore singer and composer
 Eduardo "Lalo" Parra (1918-2009) - Folklore singer and musician
 Roberto Parra (1921-1995) - Folklore musician
 Lautaro Parra (1928-2013) - Folklore musician
 Óscar Parra (1931-2016) - Clown

Second generation
 Isabel Parra (b. 1939) - Folklore music singer
 Catalina Parra (b. 1940) - Visual artist
 Ángel Parra (1943 - 2017) - Musician
 Clarita Parra (b. 1948) - Folklore musician
 Colombina Parra (b. 1970) 
 Juan de Dios Parra (b. 1972)
 Nano Parra - Folklore Musician
 Nicanor Jr Parra (Baez)
Folklore musician

Third generation
 Cristóbal "Tololo" Ugarte (b. 1992) - Artist, Architect 
 Tita Parra (b. 1956) - Folklore music singer
 Ángel Parra Jr. (b. 1966) - former member of rock group Los Tres
 Javiera Parra (b. 1968) - Musician; member of Chilean pop/rock band Javiera y Los Imposibles
 Pedro Soler Parra (b. 1960) - Artist
 Isabel Soler Parra (b. 1962) -Artist
 Juan Andres Soler Parra (b. 1963) - Artist; member of the American Sommelier Society

Fourth generation
 Antar Parra (1985-2010) - Guitarist
 Mariana Parra (b. 1991) - Artist
 Felipe Parra (b.1991) - Engineer, Guitarist

See also
 Music of Chile

References
Los Parra y descendencia
EMOL

External links
Family tree on rodovid.org

 
Chilean folk singers